Jon Rune Strøm (born 29 January 1985 in Namsos, Norway) is a Norwegian jazz musician (upright bass, bass guitar).

Biography 
Strøm was raised on an island in north-western coast of Norway, and was early influenced by musicians like Gary Peacock and Frode Gjerstad, and participated on the album East of the West (2011), the Kjersti Stubø album How High Is the Sky (2011), he collaborates on the Norwegian Free Jazz scene with Paal Nilssen-Love's band Large Unit, Petter Wettre and with Mats Gustafsson's Nu Ensemble, further with musicians like Mats Äleklint, John Dikeman, Martin Küchen, Thomas Johansson and Tollef Østvang in different constellations like the SAKA Trio, Universal Indians, All Included and Friends & Neighbors. In 2013 he released the solo album Jøa.

Discography

Solo albums 
2013: Gøa (Stone Floor Records)

Collaborations 
With Kjersti Stubø
2011: How High Is the Sky (Bolage)

With SAKA trio (Dag Erik Knedal Andersen, Kristoffer Berre Alberts)
2011: Posh?! (FMR Records)
2012: Cementen (Stone Floor Records)

With Friends & Neighbors (Tollef Østvang, Oscar Grönberg, André Roligheten, Thomas Johansson)
2011: No Beat Policy (Øra Fonogram)
2014: Hymn For A Hungry Nation (Clean Feed)

With Frode Gjerstad Trio
2011: Mir (Circulasione Totale)
2011: East Of West (Circulasione Totale)
2012: Hide Out (PNL)
2014: Russian Standard (Not Two Records)
2015: Miyazaki (FMR Records)
2015: At Constellation (Circulasione Totale), with Steve Swell

With Universal Indian (Tollef Østvang, John Dikeman)
2012: Nihil Is Now (Stone Floor Records)
2014: Skullduggery (Clean Feed), with Joe McPhee

With All Included (Tollef Østvang, Martin Küchen, Mats Äleklint, Thomas Johansson)
2012: Reincarnation Of A Free Bird (Stone Floor Records)
2015: Satan In Plain Clothes (Clean Feed)

With Mats Gustafsson & NU Ensemble (Ingebrigt Haker Flaten, Per Ake Holmlander, Kjell Nordeson, Agustí Fernández, Christer Bothenm, Joe McPhee, Peter Evans, Stine Janvind Motland, Paal Nilssen-Love)
2013: Hidros6: Solos, Duos, Groups (Not Two Records)
2014: Hidros6: Knockin (Not Two Records)

With Paal Nilssen-Love) Large Unit
2014: Erta Ale (PNL)

With Martin Küchen, Tollef Østvang
2015: Melted Snow (NoBusiness Records)

With Keefe Jackson, Josh Berman, Tollef Østvang
2015: Southern Sun (NoBusiness Records)

See also 

 List of jazz bassists

References

External links 

Norwegian jazz composers
Avant-garde jazz double-bassists
Norwegian jazz upright-bassists
Male double-bassists
Avant-garde jazz musicians
Norwegian musicians
21st-century Norwegian musicians
Musicians from Namsos
1985 births
Living people
21st-century double-bassists
21st-century Norwegian male musicians
NoBusiness Records artists